Jack Oxenrider (December 1, 1922 – April 6, 2004) was an American football, baseball, and basketball player and coach. He played for one season with the St. Joseph Outlaws of the Professional Basketball League of America. Oxenrider served as the head football, basketball, and baseball at his alma mater, William Penn University during the 1948–49 academic year.

Head coaching record

Football

References

External links
 Pro Basketball Encyclopedia entry

1922 births
2004 deaths
Basketball coaches from Iowa
Professional Basketball League of America players
William Penn Statesmen baseball coaches
William Penn Statesmen football coaches
William Penn Statesmen football players
William Penn Statesmen men's basketball coaches
William Penn Statesmen men's basketball players
Sportspeople from Des Moines, Iowa
Players of American football from Des Moines, Iowa
Basketball players from Des Moines, Iowa